"Merry Muthafuckin' X-Mas" is  the fourth compilation album from the late rapper Eazy-E. It was released on December 4, 2015. The tracks were originally featured on 5150 Home 4 Tha Sick".

Track listing

Samples
Dope Man
Deck The Halls

References  

-McNassar

Eazy-E albums
EPs published posthumously
2015 EPs
Ruthless Records EPs
Gangsta rap EPs
G-funk EPs